FARK or fark may refer to:

 FARK, an acronym for the Armed Forces of the Republic of Kosova (Forcat e Armatosura të Republikës së Kosovës), a guerrilla warfare group in Kosovo
 FARK, an acronym for the Royal Khmer Armed Forces (Forces armées royales khmères), the Cambodian armed forces from 1953 to 1970
 Fark, a community website of news articles compiled from various internet sites
Fark, Iran (disambiguation), places in Iran
 F.A.R.K. aka Fast Assist Repair Kbot, a repair unit found in the 1997 video game Total Annihilation
 A euphemism for the word "fuck"

See also 
 Farak (disambiguation), places in Iran
 FARC, Revolutionary Armed Forces of Colombia (Fuerzas Armadas Revolucionarias de Colombia), a guerrilla warfare group